Alfred Mathieu Giard (8 August 1846 – 8 August 1908) was a French zoologist born in Valenciennes.

Biography 
In 1867 he began his studies of natural sciences at the École Normale Supérieure, followed by work as préparateur de zoologie at the laboratory of Henri de Lacaze-Duthiers (1821–1901) in Paris. In 1872 he defended his doctoral thesis with a study on compound ascidians titled "Recherches sur les ascidies composées ou synascidies". From 1873 to 1882, he was professeur suppléant of natural history at the faculty of sciences in Lille, and in the meantime, was also affiliated with the Institut industriel du Nord. In 1874 he founded a biological station at Wimereux in order to familiarize his students to marine and terrestrial organisms. At Lille, he is credited for putting together an excellent school of zoology.

In 1887 he became a lecturer at the École Normale Supérieure, and from 1888 until his death, he was a professor at the faculty of sciences in Paris, holding the chair of "evolution of living organisms". Following his death, he was succeeded at the Wimereux station by Maurice Caullery (1868–1958). Among his numerous students and assistants was philosopher of science Félix Le Dantec (1869–1917). Giard was influenced by the work of Ernst Haeckel, and considered Lamarckism and Darwinism to be complementary theories. From 1904 to 1908 he was president of the Société de biologie.

He died in Orsay on 8 August 1908, his sixty-second birthday.

Research 
He was especially interested in the relationship between host and parasite in nature (both plants and animals), and used the term "parasitic castration" to define sexual characteristic changes in the host as a result of the parasite, even when the sex glands of the host are not directly involved. He is credited for providing a description of Giardia lamblia, a gastrointestinal protozoan parasite that is named after himself and Czech physician Vilem Dusan Lambl (1824–1895). The illness associated with the parasite is sometimes called giardiasis. In 1877 he was the first scientist to describe the phylum Orthonectida (parasites of Ophiurida).

In 1894 he introduced the term "anhydrobiosis" (the ability of organisms to survive extreme dehydration). In 1905 Giard coined the word poecilogonie (poecilogony) to describe a phenomenon in which similar adults develop from dissimilar larvae in marine invertebrates.

He is remembered for his extensive research of crustaceans, particularly Epicaridea (parasitic isopods) and members of the family Bopyridae. Amongst his very numerous publications are 300 devoted to entomology. He was a figure of importance in applied entomology in France and a member of the Société entomologique de France.

References
 Lhoste, J. 1987 Les entomologistes français. 1750–1950. INRA (Institut National de la Recherche Agronomique), Paris.
 Mathieu Guerriaud, « Etudier à l'école de pharmacie de Lille avec Alfred Giard au XIXe siècle», Revue d'Histoire de la Pharmacie, vol. LXIII, no 386, 2015, p. 261–278 (ISSN 0035-2349, lire en ligne)
 Peyerimhoff, P. de 1932 La Société entomologique de France (1832–1931). Soc. Ent. France, Livre du Centenaire, Paris.
 Alfred Mathieu Giard @ Who Named It

People from Valenciennes
French zoologists
Academic staff of the University of Paris
Academic staff of the University of Lille Nord de France
École Normale Supérieure alumni
Science teachers
1846 births
1908 deaths
French carcinologists
French entomologists
Presidents of the Société entomologique de France
Lamarckism
Members of the French Academy of Sciences
Members of the Royal Academy of Belgium
Chevaliers of the Légion d'honneur
Members of the Ligue de la patrie française